Ripley-Union-Lewis-Huntington High School is a public high school in Ripley, Ohio, United States. It is the only high school in the Ripley-Union-Lewis-Huntington School District.

Athletics

See also Ohio High School Athletic Association and Ohio High School Athletic Conferences.

The school's mascot is the blue jay.

Notes and references

External links
 

High schools in Brown County, Ohio
Public high schools in Ohio